Klaus Peter Möller (8 August 1937 – 20 January 2022) was a German politician. A member of the Christian Democratic Union of Germany, he served in the Landtag of Hesse from 1977 to 2003 and was its president from 1988 to 1991 and again from 1995 to 2003. He died on 20 January 2022, at the age of 84.

References

1937 births
2022 deaths
20th-century German politicians
21st-century German politicians
Members of the Landtag of Hesse
Christian Democratic Union of Germany politicians
Politicians from Darmstadt